Pulse Demon is an album by the Japanese noise musician Merzbow, released 28 May 1996. The album was reissued on vinyl in May 2018 by Bludhoney Records,  and again in November 2019 by Relapse, with a bonus track.

Background
The holographic, shiny silver artwork is a homage to the 1970s Prospective 21e Siècle imprint of Philips Records, in particular the albums of Ivo Malec. However, the art is most similar to the work of Bridget Riley, "Fall" and "Current" in particular.

The title was inspired by the 1970s afro-rock band Demon Fuzz and Akita's use of a fuzz box as a pulse generator. Some song titles were inspired by Jon Appleton's Appleton Syntonic Menagerie LP.

Reception
Critical reaction to Pulse Demon was mixed. Pitchfork gave the album's 2003 re-release a score of 8.7/10, their highest rating out of their eight reviews of Merzbow albums. Calling it an "incomparable classic", the reviewer describes the album as "simply pure sound, viciously unadulterated static", going on to state that "music cannot get much more extreme than this. Maybe John Cage's 4′33″, and that's so far to the limit, it's probably cheating. This is the edge of music, of sound in general." Also praised was the album's packaging, being called "more valuable than some people's lives." However, AllMusic's dismissive two-line review from Jason Ankeny simply said "Merzbow's second American release offers more of the deafening white noise that is his trademark, mastered for maximum loudness. Not for the faint of heart, but ideally suited for the hard of hearing." Being given only 2.5/5 stars, Pulse Demon is one of the four lowest rated of AllMusic's 31 (solo) Merzbow reviews. The A.V. Club, in their review, described the album as "genuinely extreme, downright torturous sounds that are strangely compelling in their shredding intensity."

Track listing

Original version

Remastered version

Notes
All composed by live noise concrete. No over dub.
Mastered at SAE Mastering, Phoenix, AZ, January 1996.

Personnel
Masami Akita – metals, EMS, audio generator, shortwave, noise electronics, tape, voice
Colour Climax – visual
Bill Yurkiewicz & David Shirk – mastering

Release history

References

Merzbow albums
1996 albums